The Beara-Breifne Way is a long-distance walking and cycling trail being developed from the Beara Peninsula in County Cork, Ireland, to Blacklion in the area of Breifne in County Cavan. The trail follows closely the line of the historical march of O’Sullivan Beare.

Route
The completed route will interconnect existing walking routes: The Beara Way, the Sli Gaeltacht Mhuscrai, the North Cork Way, the Ballyhoura Way, the Multeen Way, the Ormond Way, the Hymany Way, the Suck Valley Way, the Lung Lough Gara Way, the Miners Way and Historical Trail, the Leitrim Way and the Cavan Way. At Blacklion the walk continues as the Ulster Way.

References

Long-distance trails in the Republic of Ireland